Steve Speirs (born Steven Roberts, 22 February 1965) is a Welsh actor and writer who has appeared in films such as Star Wars: Episode I – The Phantom Menace and Pirates of the Caribbean: Dead Man's Chest.

Early life
He was born as Steven Roberts in Troed-y-rhiw, a village now in the borough of Merthyr Tydfil, Wales and went to school at Afon Taf High School where he found a taste for drama. He joined the National Youth Theatre of Wales and studied drama at Loughborough University. He says he took his stage name, Speirs, from the surname of a lecturer at college.

Career
Since graduating from university, Speirs has played Sloan in Eragon, Andy Fellows in Making Waves and with  Ricky Gervais in Extras, as well as playing Captain Tarpals in Star Wars: Episode I – The Phantom Menace  and having a small role in Pirates of the Caribbean: Dead Man's Chest.

He appears in Kröd Mändoon and the Flaming Sword of Fire, a comedy fantasy series in which he plays Loquasto, an oafish servant, "who belongs to a race of pig-like creatures known as Grobble".

He wrote his first film, Caught in the Act, in 2008 and starred in it as the lead character. Based on his memories of growing up in south Wales, it was filmed in the Merthyr Tydfil area.

Speirs often goes by the name of "Dullard" in honour of his role in Extras, as he considers the character a mirror of himself. Speirs also appeared in the Gervais and Stephen Merchant film Cemetery Junction released in 2010, a part which was written particularly for him. Speirs also starred as the bouncer at Mother McOakley's Tavern in Burke and Hare, a British black comedy directed by John Landis and released (in the United Kingdom) in October 2010.
He also starred in a CBBC show called Sadie J where he portrayed Sadie's dad, a mechanic. 
Other roles which Speirs is known for include his portrayal of Bernard Bresslaw in Cor, Blimey!, Big Alan Williams in Stella and Colour Sergeant Wormwood in Sharpe's Peril.
He also appears as a postman on the last episode of Miranda season 3.
Speirs played depressed geography teacher and caretaker Mr Gareth Barber in the BBC One sitcom Big School for two series in 2013 and 2014.

In 2013, Spiers played PC McClintock in the Christmas TV film Gangsta Granny, an adaptation of the book written by David Walliams. He played the role of Dad in the 2014 TV film The Boy in the Dress, also written by Walliams.

In 2015 he appeared in the TV spin off The Bad Education Movie playing Don alongside the main cast of Bad Education as well as many other guests in the movie. The same year, he also appeared in the pilot of the radio sitcom Ankle Tag, which went on to air three series in 2017, 2018 and 2020.

In 2016 he appeared in Ben Elton's BBC One comedy series Upstart Crow playing Richard Burbage , the actor and leader of Will's acting company. He has continued in this role for three series ( 2016, 2017 & 2018) with two Christmas spin-offs in 2017 & 2018 and in the London West End in Elton's stage version of the show titled The Upstart Crow.

He has created, written and starred in The Tuckers for BBC Wales and BBC iPlayer.

In 1998 he appeared in the video for the Super Furry Animals song Ice Hockey Hair.

Personal life
Speirs lives in Brighton, East Sussex. He has two sons, Jack and Lewes with his first wife. He remarried and has a son and a daughter with his second wife Joanna. His brother is opera singer Jeffrey Lloyd Roberts.

Filmography
Film

Television

References

External links 
 Steve Speirs at the British Film Institute
 

1965 births
Living people
Alumni of Loughborough University
Welsh male film actors
Welsh male television actors
People from Merthyr Tydfil